Dillon Beach is a census-designated place (CDP) in Marin County, California, United States. The population was 246 at the 2020 census. Dillon Beach was named after the founder, George Dillon, who settled there in 1858. The area includes a public access beach, as well as a private beach resort, the only private beach in California.

Geography

Like an underwater park, this marine protected area helps conserve ocean wildlife and marine ecosystems.

History

The Coast Miwok people had a presence in the area around Dillon Beach long before Europeans arrived in the Americas. It is thought that a few of their villages lay within the greater Dillon Beach area, including one around the feature known locally as the Sand Point.

In the 1850s, local historical figure Tom Wood operated in the area, employing the natives in harvesting of grain to be milled nearby. He would attempt to ensure that they were not taken advantage of by the British, French, or American traders that would ply the coast. Hides and tallow were traded for various manufactured goods, among them whiskey. Despite Wood's efforts, many of them would fall victim to alcoholism, and while a few claim descent from the local Coast Miwoks, no full-blooded members live today. Tom's Point, immediately south of Dillon Beach on the eastern shore of the bay, is named for Tom Wood, and Wood resided there with the small village he ingratiated himself into.

Irishman George Dillon and wife Mathilda arrived at what is now Dillon Beach from the eastern U.S. in 1868. When his friends and family showed interest in the area, he thought to capitalize on it; in 1888, he built an 11 bedroom hotel, restaurant, and general store. This is the Dillon Beach Resort in operation today. Visitors would explore the area on their way up the coast toward the redwood forests, strolling the beach, fishing, or digging clams from the nearby clam bars of Tomales Bay.

In 1903, Dillon sold out to John Keegan with the agreement that the beach would always be named Dillon Beach. Keegan also built cottages, one of which still stands along the road to the beach. Keegan ran a stagecoach from Dillon Beach to Tomales where it met the train.

Keegan sold the holdings to the California Eucalyptus Plantation Company in 1911. They planted the area with eucalyptus trees, a few of which still stand, but continued to operate the resort, and redoubled these efforts as the eucalyptus crop proved to warp easily and was effectively worthless. Under the subsidiary of the Dillon Beach Company, they operated the resort, ferried guests from the train in Tomales, ran a charter boat, and created Portola Beach, a subdivision along Cliff Street. Try as they might, their Dillon Beach operations were failing.

When regular visitors and Woodland ranchers Sylvester and Carrie Lawson offered to lease the property, the California Eucalyptus Plantation Company promptly agreed. Different portions of the business and land were leased or purchased by the Lawson family, and by 1942 Dillon Beach was firmly in Lawson hands. Sylvester and Carrie's older son, Howard, and his wife, Winifred, owned and ran the resort, while the younger son, Walter, and his wife, Nita, ran the southern side of the property, operating it as a ranch and opening Lawsons Landing on it. The Landing is operated by Walter's descendants to this day as a campground with a store and boating access to Tomales Bay.

During World War II, fears of a Japanese invasion of the West Coast were considered well founded, especially along sparsely populated Marin and Sonoma counties, where enemy forces could conceivably make landfall and prepare for a larger invasion of San Francisco Bay. The military commandeered many cottages and monitored the water from outposts on the surrounding hills supported by ground patrols. The sand dunes on the Lawsons Landing property were also a site for rifle and grenade practice, and the Lawson family recalls at least one instance of an armored vehicle's .50 caliber machine gun being fired around their cows, resulting in a tense conversation between soldiers and ranchers. One soldier reportedly sighted a Japanese submarine off the beach, prompting the garrison to scramble to nearby Marshall to requisition its civilian fishing boats for use in a counterattack, several of which were run by their respective owners. It took several hours to coordinate the operation, and once the soldiers finally arrived at the area of the supposed sighting, armed only with small arms, the submarine had departed, if it had been there at all.

The College of the Pacific operated from 1933 until some time in the 1980s. It stood between Portola Beach and Lawsons Landing, offering a hands-on experience for a small number of marine biology students. The concrete foundation is all that remains today, hinting at what was there before to passersby today.

During the 1960s, Oceana Marin was developed north of town by John Keegan's grandson, James Keegan of Wells Fargo Bank and Henry Trione of Sonoma County Mortgage. Fancy modern coastal houses were built on the hillsides overlooking the quaint town of small cottages, giving it a unique appeal.

The resort, day use beach, and restaurant were sold to Fred Cline in 1990 by the Lawsons. He would sell in 2018 to the group of investors owning it today.

Dillon Beach Resort
Between 2001 and 2018, Dillon Beach Resort was owned and operated by Fred and Nancy Cline of Sonoma Valley, California.  In April 2018, Mike Goebel purchased the resort.
It is one of the few beaches with private (for-fee) access in northern California. 
In California, public access is permitted below the high tide line. The horrible lines of traffic in Dillon Beach are caused by people waiting for entry into the parking lot of Dillon Beach Resort's beach lot. On hot holidays the line can extend all the way up to Elephant Rocks, almost a mile away.

Demographics

2010
At the 2010 census, Dillon Beach had a population of 283. The racial makeup of Dillon Beach was 266 (94.0%) White, 3 (1.1%) Native American, 4 (1.4%) Asian, and 10 (3.5%) from two or more races. Hispanic or Latino of any race were 9 people (3.2%).

The census reported that 100% of the population lived in households.

There were 147 households, 20 (13.6%) had children under the age of 18 living in them, 79 (53.7%) were opposite-sex married couples living together, 6 (4.1%) had a female householder with no husband present, 2 (1.4%) had a male householder with no wife present.  There were 6 (4.1%) unmarried opposite-sex partnerships, and 3 (2.0%) same-sex married couples or partnerships. 48 households (32.7%) were one person and 26 (17.7%) had someone living alone who was 65 or older. The average household size was 1.93.  There were 87 families (59.2% of households); the average family size was 2.37.

The age distribution was 28 people (9.9%) under the age of 18, 7 people (2.5%) aged 18 to 24, 44 people (15.5%) aged 25 to 44, 127 people (44.9%) aged 45 to 64, and 77 people (27.2%) who were 65 or older.  The median age was 57.4 years. For every 100 females, there were 95.2 males.  For every 100 females age 18 and over, there were 94.7 males.

There were 440 housing units at an average density of 147.5 per square mile, of the occupied units 125 (85.0%) were owner-occupied and 22 (15.0%) were rented. The homeowner vacancy rate was 5.3%; the rental vacancy rate was 59.3%. 84.5% of the population lived in owner-occupied housing units and 15.5% lived in rental housing units.

2000
At the 2000 census, there were 319 people, 155 households, and 103 families in the CDP.  The population density was 107/sq mi (41.5/km).  There were 415 housing units at an average density of 140/sq mi (54/km).  The racial makeup of the CDP in 2010 was 90.8% non-Hispanic White, 1.1% Native American, 1.4% Asian, and 3.5% from two or more races. 3.2% of the population were Hispanic or Latino of any race.
Of the 155 households 17.4% had children under the age of 18 living with them, 59.4% were married couples living together, 4.5% had a female householder with no husband present, and 33.5% were non-families. 27.7% of households were one person and 10.3% were one person aged 65 or older.  The average household size was 2.06 and the average family size was 2.47.

The age distribution was 14.4% under the age of 18, 1.3% from 18 to 24, 18.8% from 25 to 44, 43.6% from 45 to 64, and 21.9% 65 or older.  The median age was 52 years. For every 100 females, there were 95.7 males.  For every 100 females age 18 and over, there were 95.0 males.

The median household income was $47,679 and the median family income  was $52,000. Males had a median income of $40,714 versus $37,083 for females. The per capita income for the CDP was $39,475.  None of the families and 1.3% of the population were living below the poverty line, including no under-eighteens and none of those over 64.

References

Populated coastal places in California
Census-designated places in Marin County, California
West Marin
Census-designated places in California